Melaleuca subtrigona is a plant in the myrtle family, Myrtaceae, and is endemic to the south-west of Western Australia. It is a small shrub with warty leaves and heads of "pom-pom" flowers in spring and early summer.

Description
They are covered with fine, silky hairs, are linear to narrow oval shaped, oval in cross section and have distinct, slightly raised oil glands.

The flowers are a shade of pink to purple and are arranged in heads on the ends of branches which continue to grow after flowering. The stamens are arranged in five bundles around the flowers and each bundle contains 3 to 7 (but mostly 3) stamens.

Taxonomy
Melaleuca subtrigona was first formally described in 1844 by Johannes Conrad Schauer in Plantae Preissianae. The specific epithet (subtrigona) is from the Ancient Greek word trigonos meaning triangular and the prefix sub- meaning “under” referring to the shape of the leaves as being almost triangular in cross-section.

Distribution and habitat
Melaleuca sieberi occurs in and between the Brookton, Stirling Range and Ravensthorpe districts in the Avon Wheatbelt, Esperance Plains, Jarrah Forest, Mallee and Swan Coastal Plain biogeographic regions. It grows in sand, clay and laterite on sandplains and hills.

Conservation
This species is classified as "not threatened" by the Government of Western Australia Department of Parks and Wildlife.

References

subtrigona
Plants described in 1844
Endemic flora of Western Australia